The Silence in My Heart is the sixth installment in The Emo Diaries series of compilation albums, released July 24, 2001 by Deep Elm Records. As with all installments in the series, the label had an open submissions policy for bands to submit material for the compilation, and as a result the music does not all fit within the emo style. As with the rest of the series, The Silence in My Heart features mostly unsigned bands contributing songs that were previously unreleased.

Reviewer Kurt Morris of Allmusic remarks that "With artists from Japan, U.S., Canada, Germany, Sweden, Italy, and England, this compilation unquestionably shows the universality of the emo genre and its effect on independent musicians everywhere. Compared to the rather drab fifth chapter, The Silence in My Heart sparkles."

Track listing

References

External links 
 The Silence in My Heart at Deep Elm Records.

2001 compilation albums
Deep Elm Records compilation albums
Emo compilation albums
Indie rock compilation albums